Miandorud-e Kuchak Rural District is a rural district (dehestan) in the Central District of Sari County, Mazandaran Province, Iran. At the 2006 census, its population was 33,905, in 8,876 families. The rural district has 41 villages.

References 

Rural Districts of Mazandaran Province
Sari County